Spondylometaphyseal dysplasia with cone-rod dystrophy is a rare genetic disorder characterized by spondylometaphyseal dysplasia (which consists of platyspondyly, tubular bone shortening, and progressive cupping of the metaphyses), neonatal growth delays, and cone-rod dystrophy-associated progressive vision loss. Only 18 patients from families in the United States, the United Kingdom, Japan, and Brazil have been described to date. This condition is caused by autosomal recessive mutations in the PCYT1A gene, located in chromosome 3.

Other symptoms include rib anomalies, astigmatism, abnormalities in color vision, severe hyperopia/myopia, hyperlordosis, nyctalopia, nystagmus, scoliosis, and photophobia.

References 

Autosomal recessive disorders
Syndromes affecting the eye
Syndromes affecting bones
Syndromes with scoliosis